Andrew James Hall (born 12 March 1973) is an English cricketer. Hall is a right-handed batsman who bowls right-arm medium pace. He was born in Manchester, Lancashire.

Hall made his debut for Cheshire in the 1993 Minor Counties Championship against Shropshire. Hall has played Minor counties cricket for Cheshire from 1993 to the present day, including 72 Minor Counties Championship matches and 34 MCCA Knockout Trophy matches. In 1994, he made his List A debut against Durham in the NatWest Trophy. He played five further List A matches for Cheshire, the last of which came against Hampshire in the 2004 Cheltenham & Gloucester Trophy. In his six List A matches, he scored 116 runs at a batting average of 19.33, with a high score of 66. His only List A half century for Cheshire came against Cornwall in the 2001 Cheltenham & Gloucester Trophy. Hall was the Cheshire captain from 2002 to 2009.

He also played Second XI cricket for the Surrey Second XI. Hall has played for an England and Wales Cricket Board XI, representing the team in the 2004 European Cricket Championship Division One tournament, against such teams as Denmark, Ireland, the Netherlands and Scotland.

References

External links
Andrew Hall at ESPNcricinfo
Andrew Hall at CricketArchive

1973 births
Living people
Cricketers from Manchester
English cricketers
Cheshire cricketers
Cheshire cricket captains